Karabi Deka Hazarika is an Indian writer from the city of Assam in northeastern India.

Early life

Hazarika was born in the small coal mining township of Borjan in the Indian state of Nagaland. Her father, Minakanta Hazarika, was a doctor who spent most of his life serving the poor in the Naga hills. Her uncle was the author Atul Chandra Hazarika, who would later serve as Karabi's chief source of literary inspiration.

She spent her formative years in the historic town of Sibsagar, where she would attend school and college. In the year 1969, she secured first class (ranked 11th in her school) with the highest grades in Assamese in the higher secondary examination from Phuleswari Girl's Higher Secondary School. Three years later, she became the first student ever to secure first class in Assamese at Dibrugarh University by receiving first class honours in Assamese from Sibsagar Girl's College. In 1974, she post-graduated in Assamese, topping her class at Gauhati University and went on to complete a doctorate from the same institute under the guidance of famed scholar Maheshwar Neog. The title of her doctoral research was Madhavdeva: His Life, Art and Thoughts. In 1980, she married educationist and fellow academic Dr. Kandarpa Kumar Deka. She has two sons.

Career

Academic life 
Dr. Deka Hazarika joined the Assamese department of Dibrugarh University on 24 September 1976 as an Assistant Professor and went on to become an Associate Professor and Professor. Later, she became the distinguished Lakshminath Bezbarooah Chair in the same department. She is also currently acting as the Dean of Humanities and Social Sciences at Dibrugarh University and as an advisor to Dr. Bhupen Hazarika Centre for Studies in Performing Arts. The establishment of the Centre for Performing Arts is considered a significant milestone in Professor Hazarika's career. The centre was established in 2008 with Prof. Hazarika as the Founding Director and has contributed substantially in shaping up the foundation of performing arts as an academic discourse. For the first time in Northeast India, the centre began offering B.A and M.A programs in fields such as Music, Dance and Theatre. Prof. Hazarika is credited with bringing academic purview into art forms like classical dance prevalent for over five centuries in Vaishnavite Monasteries (Xatras) in Assam by adding them to the M.Phil. and Ph.D. syllabus.

Prof. Hazarika is an accomplished educationist. A substantial number of researchers have worked under her supervision. Her contributions from 1991 as the Lead Coordinator of the Department of Assamese include turning the department into a centre of excellence under the University Grants Commission's (UGC) and the Department of Special Assistance along with Centre for the Advanced Studies-II initiative.

Literary life 
Dr. Deka Hazarika's literary style is multifaceted. Her first poem ‘Anjali’, containing patriotic fervour based on the Indo-China war of 1962, was published in the newspaper ‘Asom Bani’ when she was in fifth grade. Afterward, her interest in poetry and writings grew as she began publishing frequently in the children's corners of newspapers and magazines like ‘Asom Bani’, ‘Dainik Asom’, ‘Asom Batori’, ‘Deepak’, etc. Her mother Hiraprobha Hazarika and maternal uncle Atul Cahndra Hazarika were constant source of encouragement. Witnessing literary meet-ups of Assam's literary elite in her uncle's house left an impact on the young girl's literary pursuits.

In 1970,  Hazarika entered the new world of Assamese poetry with her own style. Her publications in magazines such as ‘Nagarik’, ‘Prakash’, ‘Saptahik Nilachal’, ‘Prantik’, etc. soon captured the attention of both readers as well as critics. Since then, through her sizeable contribution, both in quality and quantity, to Assamese poetry, Hazarika has one of the most prominent poets in Assam. Her poems are expressions of tender self immersed musings tinged with sharp insights into social discourses. Her poems of the early youth are charming in their recollections of love and separation. Most of her poems are made of brief stanzas thick with emotions.  Her most common motifs were river, night, and dew.  Although primarily a poet of personal musings, her poems also brilliantly discussed many social issues such as in the poem, "Suli Nebandhiba Jagyasini" (Don't plait your hair Jagyasini). Similarly, poems like ‘Sita’, ‘Raj Pothto Draupadi', and ‘Jwalamukhi’ have echoed empathy and solidarity with the women's rights movement. Poems like ‘Neel Junaki’ (Blue Firefly), ‘Porir Banhi’ (Fairy's Flute), ‘Jol Kunworir Saa’, ‘Buku Jurai Aanhe’, ‘Bakhyahin’, ‘Jonmo Nuhua Sualijoni (Unborn Daughter), ‘Siyang', etc. on the other hands delight the readers through their universal aesthetics.

Hazarika has also created a considerable fan base as a lyricist and she is often played by the All India Radio. Tender with layered meanings, her songs portray the bittersweet feelings of love and its absence, one’s interaction with the nature around, as well as issues pertaining to society at large.

Karabi Deka Hazarika’s most significant contribution to the contemporary trends of Assamese literature, however, has been the initiation of a new trend of travel literature in Assamese. Through a corpus of five travelogues, accounts of her forays into the lands of Americas, China, Maldives, and Greece, she has refined the art of travel writing in Assamese. In her travel accounts, she often mentions the cultural and historical contexts of the places she visits and puts them in contemporary socio-political-ecological perspectives. Dotted with interesting anecdotes and entertaining backstories, her travel books have become happy reads across generations.

Deka Hazarika is also an accomplished literary critic. She has published books on the ancient as well the evolving and modern aspects of Assamese literature. Many of her research papers and journals on similar themes are spread across different volumes. Poetry is her favourite topic of discussion. Books like Asomiya Kobita, Asomiya Kobi Aru Kobita, Kobitar Rup Chaya, Adhunikotar Puhorot Asomiya aru Bangla Kobita, etc. reflects her unique insights into the trends of Assamese poetry. Her scholastic work on Madhavdev, Kola Aru Dorxon is especially important in the field of religious research in Assam.

Some of the prominent works that have established her as an illustrious editor are ‘Ehajar Bosoror Asomiya Kobita’, ‘Bezbaroar Rachna Chayan’, ‘Kirtan Gosha aru Naam Gosha’ , ‘Seemar Poridhi Bhangi’, ‘Bangla Suti Golpo’, and ‘Ramayanar Saneki' .

One of Deka Hazarika’s favourite genres of writing is children’s literature. She has authored many stories and poems that resonate well with the language and psyche of the children and adolescents. These writings explore the esoteric life-worlds of children made up of fantasies and adventures, with frequent forays into the animal kingdom and the other extravaganzas offered by a bountiful nature. Her use of simple language, wit, and her portrayal of everyday life that connects with children’s minds sets her apart from other children’s literature authors.

‘Anupama. Aruna, Kusum, Ityadi’ is a unique testament to the struggle of Assamese women for equal rights and recognition. The narrative revolving around the main character Kusum portrays the different evolving stages in the battle for equal status by Assamese women, both within and outside the household, in the larger social realm.

Prof. Hazarika is also a well-admired name in translating literature into Assamese. Her Assamese translation of the award-winning Konkani novel ‘Karmeline’ has been well received.

Sahitya Akademi and Karabi Deka Hazarika 

In 2003, Karabi Deka Hazarika was elected as the advisor and coordinator to the Assamese language advisory board of Sahitya Akademi. After successfully completing a five-year term in that position, she was reelected to the position in 2012. She had also performed the role of Coordinator for the Northeastern Zone of the Akademi as well as being a member of the Committee on Oral Literature of the Akedemi. During her tenure, programs in the Akademi had, for the first time, spread across the state and not just the few fixed centres of activities like metros and big towns, thus connecting the Akedemi to more people across Assam.

Travels and participations 
She has attended literary meets and conferences in different regions, including the United States of America (Florida, New York, Orlando), Latin America (Peru, Cuba), Greece (Athens, Santorini), China (Beijing, Zhiang, Shanghai), Malaysia, Singapore, Bangladesh and the Maldives.

Awards
 Best Women Writer of the Decade (1980–90) "Basanta Bordoloi Award" by Asom Sahitya Sabha in 1991.
 "Best Women Writer" by All Assam Women Writers Association in 2007
 "Prabia Saikia Award" by All Assam Women Writers Organisation in 2013.
 "Kavya Hriday Samman" by Call of the Brahmaputra, Guwahati in 2010.

Works
Literary criticism: 
 Asamiya Sahityar Rup Ras, Banalata, Dibrugarh, 1985
 Madhavadeva: Sahitya, Kala Aru Darsan, Banalata, Dibrugarh, 1987
 Saityar Chinta-Shaya, Banalata, Dibrugarh, 1995
 Sahitya aru Chinta,Banalata, Dibrugarh, 1996
 Kabitar Rup-Shaya, Banalata, Dibrugarh, 1999 
 Asamiya Kabita, Banalata, Dibrugarh, 1999
 Tulanamulak Sahitya Aru Anubad Kala, Banalata, Dibrugarh, 2003
 Tulanamulak Adhyayan, Department of Assamese, Dibrugarh University, 2003
 Charyapad Aru Bargeet (Jointly with Manju Chakraborty), Banalata, Dibrugarh, 2004
 Asamiya Kabi Aru Kabita, Banalata, Dibrugarh, 2004
 Sahitya Sanchayan, Banalata, Dibrugarh, 2005
 Sahityar Swarup, Sahitya Akademi, Kolkata, 2007
 Asomiya Aru Bangla Kabitat Adhunikatar Unmes, Kiran Prakashan, Dhemaji, 2008
 Tulanamulak Sahitya: Bikas aru Bivartan, Department of Assamese, Dibrugarh University, 2008
 Tulanamulak Sahitya: Bisayar Aru Bisay Praves, Department of Assamese, Dibrugarh University, 2009
 Maheswar Neog—A Monograph, Dibrugarh University, In Press
 Ramayanar Chaneki, Banalata, Dibrugarh, 1993
 Asamiya Premar Kabita (Jointly with Homen Borgohain), Students’ Store, Guwahati, 1995
 Ramayana, Ayodha Kanda	Students’ Emporium, Guwahati, 1997
 Nagen Saikia: Byaktiva Aru Krititva,Bani Mandir, Dibrugarh, 1997
 Usha Parinoy, Banalata, Dibrugarh, 1998
 Kirtan Ghosa aru Namghosha, Banalata, Dibrugarh, 1999
 Sahitya Patrika	Reception Committee, 60th Assam Sahitya Sabha	2001
 Dibarur Kabita	-do-	2001
 Praval Dripar Dare	Department of Assamese, D.U.	2003
 Parvati Prasad Baruar Kriti Aru Krititva	Asam Sahitya Sabha	2004
 Manat Parene Arundhati	Banalata, Dibrugarh	2005
 Nirbachita Bharatiya Kabita	Department of Assamese, Dibrugarh University	2005
 Simar Paridhi Bhangi Kabita (Translation of old Poetry)	-do-	2010
 Samikshan (Compilation of Seminar Papers)	-do-	2010
 Kripabar Baruar Kakatar Tupula, Kaustubh Prakashan, Dibrugarh	2010
 Bezbaroar Sahitya Chaya, Assam Publishing Company, Guwahati	2012
 Ehejar Basarar Asamiya Kabita	Banalata, Dibrugarh	2013
 Nabajagaranar Gadya	Sahitya Akademi, New Delhi	In press
 Asamiya Gadya Sahitya—Jonakir Pora Jayantiloi (Jointly with Dr Satyakam Borthakur)
 Madhavadeva: His Life, Art and Thought, Bani Mandir, Guwahati	2006

Children's literature
 Junukar Erati, Students’ Store, Guwahai, 1992
 Chikmikar Kahini, Students’ Store, Guwahai, 1992
 Seuji Manar Kahii, Students’ Store, Guwahai, 1992
 Bharatiya Sahityar Unmuchak, Asam Sahitya Sabha, 1999
 Bezbaroar Sadhu Katha (edited),Banalata, Dibrugarh, 2001
 Emuthi Sonali Tora (edited),Balya Bhawan Jorhat, 2001
 Lion King, Banalata, Dibrugarh, 2002
 Gun Guwa Bhut, Kaustubh Prakashan, Dibrugarh, 2005
 Helen Kelar, Kaustubh Prakashan, Dibrugarh, 2012

Travelogue
 Nila Sagar Aru Sonali Desh, Banalata, Dibrugarh	
 Seujia Chin, Kiran Prakashan, Dhemaji	2008
 Greece Desar Surjyamukhi Din Aru Aparajita Rati, Banalata, Dibrugarh	2011
 Latin Americar Bismoy Aru Siharan, Banalata, Dibrugarh, 2015
 Nirjan Saukatar Monimoy Dinbur, Assam Publishing Company, Guwahati	2016

Novel:
 Jonakar Akhar, Banalata, Dibrugarh, 2000
 Aranyar Shan, Banalata, Dibrugarh, 2005
 Anupama, Aruna, Kusum Ityadi, Banalata, Dibrugarh, 2007

Poems and lyrics
 Subasita Yi Yantrana	1st Edition : Deep-Sikha Prakashan, Guwahati
 Matir Para Meghaloi	Banalata, Dibrugarh, 1992
 Chuli Nabanndhiba Yagyaseni, 2001
 Parir Banhi, Kaustubh Prakashan, Dibrugarh, 2008
 Emuthi Sonali Tara, Tinsukia, 1995
 Ganar Pakhi, Kaustubh Prakashan, Dibrugarh, 2002

Translated books
 Nirbachita Bangla Kabita, Students’Emporium, Guwahati, 1996
 Jibanananda Das, Sahitya Akademi, New Delhi, 2000
 Kermelin, Sahitya Akademi, New Delhi,2011

References 

Living people
Novelists from Assam
20th-century Indian women writers
1953 births
Women writers from Assam
20th-century Indian poets
Indian women poets
20th-century Indian novelists
Indian women novelists
Indian children's writers
Indian women children's writers
Indian travel writers
Indian women travel writers
Indian literary critics
Indian women critics
21st-century Indian women writers
21st-century Indian poets
21st-century Indian novelists
Poets from Assam
People from Sivasagar
Academic staff of Dibrugarh University